A number of ships of the French Navy have borne the name Brave. Among them:

 , a 48-gun ship of the line, was named Brave during part of her career.
 , a galley
 , a 48-gun ship of the line, was named Brave during part of her career.
 , a 56-gun ship of the line
 , a 50-gun ship of the line
 , a 74-gun ship of the line, was named Brave during part of her career.
 , a galley
 , a 60-gun ship of the line
 , a galley
 , an ordinary galley
 , an ordinary galley
 , an 80-gun ship of the line, was named Brave during part of her career.
 , a gunboat
 , a 74-gun ship of the line
 , a brig, was renamed Arrogante; the Royal Navy captured her in 1798 and she became HMS Arrogante and then HMS Insolent. She was sold in 1818. 

Ships with related names 
 , a xebec, was named Brave sans culotte during part of her career.
 , a 40-gun .

Sources and references 

French Navy ship names